Zheng Yixin (born 6 May 1995 in Zhangzhou, Fujian) is a Chinese volleyball player. She is the Middle Blocker of China women's national volleyball team. She played at 2015 FIVB Volleyball World Grand Prix Final round, which was held in Omaha, Nebraska.

She was part of the China team in 2017 who took part in the FIVB Volleyball World Grand Prix in Macao. The team who included Zhu Ting, Qian Jingwen, Wang Yunlu played against the US, Turkey and Italy. The final part of the competition was in Nanjing in China where the team came fourth.

Personal
Zheng Yixin plays for the Fujian Yango Women's Volleyball Club. Her father was a high jumper.

Clubs
  Fujian Yango Women's Volleyball Club (2014-)
 Diamond Food  (2020)

References

1995 births
Living people
Chinese women's volleyball players
Sportspeople from Zhangzhou
Middle blockers
Opposite hitters
21st-century Chinese women